Buna is a Torricelli language of Marienberg Rural LLG, East Sepik Province, Papua New Guinea.

There are two dialects. One dialect is spoken in Kasmin, Boig, Waskurin, and Arapang villages, and another in Masan, Mangan, and Garien villages.

Morphology
Buna has four noun classes. Noun class concord affixes in Buna are shown in the following examples.

Class 1

{| 
! singular (masculine) !! plural (masculine)
|-
|
|
|}

Class 2

{| 
! singular (feminine) !! plural (feminine)
|-
|
|
|}

Class 3

{| 
! singular (class III) !! plural (class III)
|-
|
|
|}

Class 4

{| 
! singular (class IV) !! plural (class IV)
|-
|
|
|}

References

External links 
 Paradisec houses a collection of Arthur Capell's materials that include Boiken (AC2) as well as recordings by Bill Foley (WF3) and notebooks from Don Laycock's work (DL2). All of these collections are open access.

Marienberg languages
Languages of East Sepik Province